XHTY-FM 91.3/XETY-AM 1390 is a combo radio station in Tecomán, Colima, Mexico owned by Grupo Radiorama and carrying its Xplosion Top 40 (CHR) format.

History

XETY-AM formally signed on October 17, 1962. It was owned by Manuel Ayala Estrada, who also worked for Colima's XHCC-TV channel 5, and initially broadcast on 1400 kHz. It was sold to Delia Escamilla de Martínez in 1972. After its sale to Víctor Manuel Martínez Jiménez in 1991, it obtained an FM combo station in 1994.

References

1962 establishments in Mexico
Grupo Radiorama
Radio stations established in 1962
Radio stations in Colima
Regional Mexican radio stations
Spanish-language radio stations